Tafsīr al-Qurʾān al-ʿAẓīm better known as Tafsir Ibn Kathir is the tafsir by Ibn Kathir (died 774 AH). It is one of the most famous Islamic books concerned with the science of interpretation of the Quran. It also includes jurisprudential rulings, and takes care of the hadiths and is famous for being almost devoid of Israʼiliyyat. It is the most followed tafsir by salafist muslims.

Background 

Ibn Kathir did not specify the date of his beginning in commentary, nor the date of its completion, but some deduce the era in which he composed it based on a number of evidence; Of which

 That he composed more than half of the exegesis in the life of his sheikh al-Mazzi (died 742 AH), based on the fact that he mentioned when interpreting Surat al-Anbiya his sheikh al-Mazzi and prayed for him for a long life.
 Abdullah Al-Zayla’i (died 762 AH) quoted him in his book Takhreej Ahadith al-Kashshaf,  which indicates that it was spread before the year 762 AH.
 It is likely that he finished his exegesis on Friday, 10 Jumada al-Thani 759 AH, when it came in the Meccan version, which is considered the oldest copy.

The status of interpretation and the interest of scholars in it

 Al-Suyuti said:  “He (i.e. Ibn Katheer) has an interpretation that was not composed according to his style.”
 Muhammad bin Ali Al-Shawkani said: “He has the famous interpretation, and it is in volumes, and it was collected in Va’i and transmitted the schools of thought, news and traces, and spoke the best and most authentic speech, and it is one of the best interpretations.
 Ahmed Muhammad Shakir said: “After that, the interpretation of Al-Hafiz Ibn Kathir is the best of the interpretations that we have seen, and the best and most accurate after the interpretation of the Imam of the commentators Abi Jaafar Al-Tabari.”
 Muhammad bin Jaafar al-Kitani said:  “It is loaded with hadiths and narrations with the chains of transmission of their narrators, while discussing them with authenticity and weakness.”
 Abd al-Aziz bin Baz said: ““The interpretation of Ibn Katheer is a great interpretation, the interpretation of Salfi according to the method of Ahl al-Sunnah wal-Jama’ah, and if the hadiths are taken care of and their way, and they are attributed to their authors, I do not know of an analogue of it.”

Description

By Darussalam Publications 
According Darussalam Publications, this tafsir divided in 10 volume with 30 parts. Each volume is 9x6" Hardback and has around 650 pages. those are below.

 Volume 1: Parts 1 and 2(Surat Al-Fatihah to Verse 252 of Surat Al-Baqarah)
 Volume 2: Parts 3, 4 & 5 (Surah Al-Baqarah, V. 253 to Surat An-Nisa, V. 147)
 Volume 3: Parts 6, 7 & 8 (Surat An-Nisa, V. 148 to the end of Surat Al-An'am)
 Volume 4: ~ Parts 8 to 11 (Surat Al-A'raf to the end of Surah Yunus)
 Volume 5: ~Parts 11 to 15 (Surah Hud to Surat Al-Isra' Verse 38)
 Volume 6: ~Parts 15 to 18 (Surat Al-Isra', Verse 39 to the end of Surat Al-Mu'minun)
 Volume 7: ~Parts 18 to 22 (Surat An-Nur to Surat Al-Ahzab, Verse 50)
 Volume 8: ~Parts 22 to 25 (Surat Al-Ahzab Verse 51 to Surat Ad-Dukhan)
 Volume 9: ~Parts 25 to 28 (Surat Al-Jathiyah to Surat Al-Munafiqun)
 Volume 10: ~Parts 28 to 30 (Surat At-Taghabun to end of the Quran)

Edition

References

14th-century Arabic books
Ibn Kathir
Webarchive template wayback links